The campus of Rice University is located on a heavily wooded  plot of land on South Main Street in the Museum District of Houston, Texas. It is located east of Rice Village, a retail district, south of Boulevard Oaks and Southampton, west of the Texas Medical Center, and north of Southgate.

Founded in 1912, the university has been developed in a relatively uniform Mediterranean Revival style, emphasizing light brick facades, quadrangles, archways, and decorative columns. There are notable exceptions to this style, including examples of brutalism and modern architecture. In recent decades, new buildings have also been constructed outside the original pentagonal campus, but nearly all academic and undergraduate residential facilities are still located there.

In addition to academic and administrative buildings, the Rice campus also includes the entirety of the residential college system, parking, recreational fields and facilities, concert halls, theatres, a student center, and sports facilities for the various Rice Owls athletic teams.

History 

Edgar Odell Lovett, the first President of Rice (then known as the William Marsh Rice Institute for the Advancement of Literature, Science, Art, Philosophy, and Letters), emphasized the need for a large campus with a uniform architectural plan during his first visit to Houston in 1907. The existing property in and around Houston bequeathed to the Institute by its late benefactor, William Marsh Rice, was deemed unsuitable for the siting of the university – Rice Ranch, located near present-day Bellaire, was too far from Houston, while a plot of land near Downtown Houston was considered too small.

Lovett expressed interest in flat farmland along Main Street north of Brays Bayou. Negotiations by Captain James A. Baker eventually led to a complicated land exchange with local entrepreneur George Hermann (namesake of Hermann Park), who owned  on both sides of Main Street. Through the deal and subsequent land exchanges, the Rice Institute had acquired  fronting the west side of Main by 1910. The modern  campus was not completed, however, until 1921, when a small parcel owned by DuPont was finally acquired.

In 1909, the Board of Trustees selected Ralph Adams Cram's firm, Cram, Goodhue, and Ferguson, to design the first five buildings and draft a master plan for the campus. The cornerstone of the Administration Building, now known as Lovett Hall, was laid in 1911. The early construction of the university was funded by the sale of timber interests on a  piece of land in Louisiana owned by the Rice estate.

In 1910, the campus power plant (now the Mechanical Laboratory) was connected to the regional rail network by a spur line, and Baker successfully negotiated with Harris County and nearby landowners to widen and run a trolley line down Main Street.

In June 2020 Rice University bought the property of the bar Ginger Man, which closed the previous spring.

Campus layout

Rice's campus is a heavily-wooded  tract of land located close to the city of West University Place in the museum district of Houston.

Five streets demarcate the campus: Greenbriar Street, Rice Boulevard, Sunset Boulevard, Main Street, and University Boulevard. For most of its history, all of Rice's buildings have been contained within this pentagon. In recent years, new facilities have been built within the vicinity of campus, but the bulk of administrative, academic, and residential buildings are still located on the original plot of land. The BioScience Research Collaborative, all graduate student housing, and the Wiess President's House are located off-campus.

Transportation within the campus is facilitated by a small network of roads. The Inner Loop, a one-way ring road, begins at the southwestern corner of the Shepherd School of Music, proceeds east-northeast past the Southern Colleges and Fondren Library, makes a 90-degree turn, passes in front of Lovett Hall, makes another 90-degree turn, continues south-southwest past the Engineering Quadrangle, Rice Memorial Center (RMC), Jones School of Business, and Recreation Center, and ends at the Shepherd School. This rectangular road is bisected by Alumni Drive, which begins at Rice Boulevard along the northwestern edge of campus and passes by Dell Butcher Hall, the Recreation Center, the RMC, the Jones School, the Baker Institute, and Wiess College before ending at Main Street. Other shorter roads connect to various campus entrances, laboratories, and sports facilities.

A majority of parking on campus is concentrated at the western end of the pentagon in the form of surface parking. Approximately  of asphalt parking surrounds Rice Stadium; West Lots 1–5 are east of the stadium and Greenbriar Lot is west. A majority of residential, visitor, and faculty parking is located here; other, smaller parking lots are scattered throughout the campus, as well as two parking garages: one underneath the Jones School and another currently under construction adjacent to Lovett College.

Rice prides itself on the amount of green space available on campus; there are only about 50 buildings spread between the main entrance at its easternmost corner, and the parking lots and Rice Stadium at the west end. The Lynn R. Lowrey Arboretum, consisting of more than 4,000 trees and shrubs (giving birth to the legend that Rice has a tree for every student), is spread throughout the campus. Because of the management of its trees on campus, Rice earned the status as a "Tree Campus USA" from the Arbor Day Foundation four times since 2012.

The university's first president, Edgar Odell Lovett, intended for the campus to have a uniform architecture style to improve its aesthetic appeal. Influenced by the campuses of southern Europe, many of Rice's buildings are Mediterranean Revival in style, with sand and pink-colored bricks, large archways and columns acting as architectural motifs. Noteworthy exceptions include the glass-walled Brochstein Pavilion, Lovett College with its Brutalist-style concrete gratings, the eclectic-Mediterranean Duncan Hall, and the modern Moody Center for the Arts.

Quadrangles 
The campus is organized around a number of quadrangles. The Academic Quadrangle, anchored by a statue of founder William Marsh Rice, includes Ralph Adams Cram's asymmetrical Lovett Hall, the original administrative building, to the east; Fondren Library to the west; Herzstein Hall, the physics building and home to the largest amphitheater on campus, to the north; Sewall Hall for the social sciences and arts to the southeast; Rayzor Hall, for the languages, to the southwest; and Anderson Hall of the School of Architecture to the northwest. The Humanities Building is located behind the southwestern corner of the Academic Quad, adjacent to Fondren Library and Rayzor Hall.

The Central Quadrangle lies to the west of Fondren Library, anchored by Brochstein Pavilion, a coffee shop and meeting space. Constructed in 2008, the glass pavilion is bounded by outdoor seating spaces, designed to revitalize the once-underused area. It is bounded by the Rice Memorial Center and Ley Student Center to the north and Herring Hall, designed by César Pelli, to the south.

Further west lies the West Quadrangle, surrounded by McNair Hall of the Jones Business School to the north, the Baker Institute to the south, and Alice Pratt Brown Hall of the Shepherd School of Music to the west. The eastern section of the quad adjoining Alumni Drive contains Jamail Plaza, donated by Lee Hage Jamail, wife of prominent attorney Joe Jamail, which includes a large globe-shaped fountain and public space connecting the Baker Institute to the Jones School.

In the Engineering Quadrangle, located north of the Inner Loop and west of Duncan College, a trinity of sculptures by Michael Heizer, collectively entitled 45°, 90°, 180°, are flanked by Abercrombie Laboratory to the east, the Cox Mechanical Engineering Building to the west, and the Mechanical Laboratory to the north. Ryon Laboratory and Keck Hall also frame this quadrangle at the northwestern and southwestern corners, respectively. Duncan Hall is the latest addition to this quad, housing offices, classrooms, labs, and lecture halls for the Electrical Engineering, Computer Science, and Statistics departments.

Residential colleges 
Roughly three-quarters of Rice's undergraduate population lives on campus. Housing is divided among eleven residential colleges, which form an integral part of student life at the university. The colleges are named for historical figures of and benefactors to the university. While there is significant variation in their appearance, facilities, and dates of founding, the colleges are an important source of identity for Rice students, functioning as dining halls, residence halls, and sports teams, among other roles. Each residential college, with the exception of Sid Richardson, possesses its own quadrangle, which provides a dedicated outdoor social and recreational space for members. Rice does not have or endorse a greek system, with the residential college system taking its place.

Five colleges – McMurtry, Duncan, Martel, Jones, and Brown – are located on the north side of campus, northeast of Lovett Hall. Six more colleges – Baker, Will Rice, Lovett, Hanszen, Sid Richardson, and Wiess – are located south of the Inner Loop and Academic Quadrangle. The south colleges are organized with respect to a pair of axes outlined in the original plan of the university. An east-west axis runs from Hanszen to Will Rice, while a north-south axis runs from the Inner Loop to Sid Richardson. The north-south axis contains the John and Anne Grove, a wide decomposed granite promenade covered by a thick canopy of cedar elm and oak trees.

Graduate housing 

Rice provides off-campus housing for graduate students at two apartment complexes. Rice Graduate Apartments (RGA), constructed in 1999, is a 220-unit garden apartment complex located on Bissonnet Street north of campus. Rice Village Apartments (RVA), constructed in 2010, is a 137-unit mid-rise building located west of campus on Shakespeare Street in Rice Village. Both complexes are served by the university shuttle system, and Rice Village Apartments (which is a LEED-certified green building) discourages car use by providing new residents with a free bicycle.

Rice Village Apartments, the designated unit for families, is within the Houston Independent School District. Residents are zoned to Roberts Elementary School, Pershing Middle School (with Pin Oak Middle School as an option), and Lamar High School.

Previously the university had another graduate housing complex, Morningside Square Apartments, which had rooms larger than the other complexes and was also designed for families. Morningside Square had 54 units. The university purchased Morningside Square from Geoprime Properties in 2001. It closed and the municipal demolition permits were issued in 2017.

Sports facilities 

The on-campus football facility, Rice Stadium, opened in 1950 with a capacity of 70,000 seats. In 2006, seating capacity was reduced to 47,000 by covering areas at each end of the field with tarps. Seating capacity was permanently reduced by the construction of the Brian Patterson Sports Performance Center in 2015, which occupies a formerly-tarped seating area behind the north endzone. The new  facility, completed in 2016, replaces dated training facilities elsewhere on campus and includes a large new scoreboard mounted to its roof. Rice Stadium was the site of a speech by President John F. Kennedy, "Address at Rice University on the Nation's Space Effort", on September 12, 1962, in which he challenged the nation to send a man to the moon by the end of the decade. In 1974, the stadium hosted Super Bowl VIII.

Reckling Park, located south of Tudor Fieldhouse along University Boulevard, is the home of Rice Owls baseball. Opened in 2000, the stadium has a capacity of over 7,000.

Tudor Fieldhouse, known as Autry Court prior to 2007, is home to the basketball and volleyball teams. Other stadia include the Wendel D. Ley Track & Holloway Field and the George R. Brown Tennis Center. The , 14-court Tennis Center, located east of Rice Stadium along Rice Boulevard, opened in 2014; it replaced the Jake Hess Tennis Center adjacent to Recking Park, which became the site of the Moody Center for the Arts in 2017.

The Barbara and David Gibbs Recreation & Wellness Center, opened in 2009, is a  facility featuring a  weight and cardio room, multipurpose fitness and dance rooms, indoor and outdoor basketball, racquetball and squash courts, a soccer and hockey arena, an Olympic-size competitive swimming pool, a recreational pool, and offices for counseling and wellbeing services. The complex was designed by SmithGroupJJR and LakeFlato Architects.

Other facilities 
In 1994, the university and Houston Independent School District jointly established The Rice School, a kindergarten through 8th grade public magnet school, in the neighborhood of Braeswood Place south of campus.

Buildings

Academic

Administrative

Residential

Athletics

Dining and services

References

Rice University
Rice University